SCAT Airlines, legally PLL SCAT Air Company, is an airline with its head office on the property of Shymkent International Airport in Shymkent, Kazakhstan. It operates services to all of the major cities of Kazakhstan and to neighbouring countries. Its main base is Shymkent Airport, with focus cities at Aktau International Airport, Nursultan Nazarbayev International Airport, and Almaty International Airport.

History
The airline was established and started operations in 1997.  Its name is the acronym of Special Cargo Air Transport.

SCAT founded Sunday Airlines as a new charter venture and subsidiary, for which SCAT operates four Boeing 757-200s and one Boeing 767-300ER.

In November 2017, the airline signed a firm contract for the purchase of six aircraft of the latest generation Boeing 737 MAX 8 with the American corporation Boeing. On 29 March 2018, the company's fleet replenished the first in the post-Soviet countries Boeing 737 MAX 8 (with CFM International LEAP-1B engines). This is the first of the six purchased Boeing 737 MAX 8 aircraft.

In 2018, European airspace restrictions were lifted for SCAT Airlines  and in May 2018, Vilnius became their first scheduled EU destination. In March 2018, SCAT Airlines was accepted as a full member of the International Air Transport Association (IATA). SCAT Airlines became the second Kazakhstan airline included in the IATA register.

On March 13, 2019, the operation of Boeing 737 MAX aircraft was suspended in Kazakhstan.

On February 18, 2021, SCAT Airlines, the first outside the American continent, resumed regular commercial flights on Boeing 737 MAX after an almost two-year ban on the operation of these aircraft in Kazakhstan.

Destinations

Codeshare agreements
SCAT Airlines codeshares with Azerbaijan Airlines.

Fleet
, the SCAT Airlines fleet consists of these aircraft:

Incidents and accidents
 On 29 January 2013, SCAT Airlines Flight 760 crashed near Kyzyltu during a low-visibility approach to Almaty International Airport. All 16 passengers and 5 crew were killed.
 On 26 July 2018, a SCAT Airlines Boeing 757-200, registration UP-B5705 performing flight DV-5038, struck its tail onto the runway surface with 236 passengers and 9 crew while going around at Almaty International Airport. No passengers or crew suffered injuries. The aircraft, however, received substantial damage.

References

External links

Official website

Airlines of Kazakhstan
Airlines established in 1997
Airlines formerly banned in the European Union
1997 establishments in Kazakhstan
Kazakhstani brands
Shymkent
Transport in Shymkent